The Royal Society of New South Wales is a learned society based in Sydney, Australia. The Governor of New South Wales is the vice-regal patron of the Society.

The Society was established as the Philosophical Society of Australasia on 27 June 1821. In 1850, after a period of informal activity, the Society was revived and its name became the Australian Philosophical Society and, in 1856, the Philosophical Society of New South Wales. The Society was granted Royal Assent on 12 December 1866 and at that time was renamed the Royal Society of New South Wales.

Membership is open to any person interested in the promotion of studies in Science, Art, Literature and Philosophy. Fellowship and Distinguished Fellowship are by election, and may be conferred on leaders in their fields. The Society is based in Sydney and has an active branch in Mittagong in the Southern Highlands of NSW. Regular monthly meetings and public lectures are well attended by both members and visitors.

The Society publishes a peer-reviewed journal, the Journal and Proceedings of the Royal Society of New South Wales, the second-oldest peer-reviewed publication in the Southern Hemisphere.

History 
The Royal Society of New South Wales, Australia traces its origins to the Philosophical Society of Australasia, established on 27 June 1821 and was the first scientific society in the then British Colony of New South Wales.

The Society was formed "with a view to enquiring into the various branches of physical science of this vast continent and its adjacent regions".  On his arrival in Sydney late in 1821, the newly appointed Governor, Sir Thomas Brisbane, was offered and accepted the position of President.

Following a period of informal activity, the Society was revitalised (led by Dr Henry Douglass, one of the original founders) and renamed the Australian Philosophical Society on 19 January 1850. The society was renamed the Philosophical Society of New South Wales in 1856. On 12 December 1866, Queen Victoria granted Royal Assent to change its name to The Royal Society of New South Wales. The Society was incorporated by Act of the New South Wales Parliament in 1881.

The rules of the Society provided that the Governor of New South Wales should be President ex officio. After the establishment of the Commonwealth of Australia in 1901, the Governor-General became Patron of the Society, and the Governor New South Wales the Vice-Patron.  From 1938 to 2014, the Society was under the joint patronage of the Governor-General of Australia and the Governor of NSW.  The Society now has a single Vice-Regal Patron, the Governor of NSW.

Throughout its history, the Society has done much to foster local research particularly in science, through meetings, symposia, publications and international scientific exchange, and has supported and fostered the endeavours of other organisations dedicated to the furtherance of knowledge.

The Society encourages "... studies and investigations in Science, Art, Literature and Philosophy, to promote and further the development of Science and its relationship with Art, Literature and Philosophy and their allied disciplines and applications, to facilitate the exchange of information and ideas amongst the Members and Fellows of the Society and others on these and kindred topics and to disseminate knowledge to the people of New South Wales and beyond ..." through the following activities:
 Publications of results of scientific investigations through its Journal and Proceedings;
 Awarding prizes and medals for outstanding achievements in research;
 Liaison with other similar bodies;
 Holding meetings for the benefit of members and the general public (special meetings are held for the Pollock Memorial Lecture in Physics and Mathematics, the Liversidge Research Lecture in Chemistry, the Poggendorf Memorial Lecture in Agriculture, the Clarke Memorial Lecture in Geology and the Warren Lecture and Prize in engineering, applied science and technology, and the Royal Society of NSW History and Philosophy of Science Medal); and
 Maintaining a library.

Journal 
The Society's journal, the Journal and Proceedings of the Royal Society of New South Wales is one of the oldest peer-reviewed publications in the Southern Hemisphere. Much innovative research of the 19th and early 20th centuries (e.g. Lawrence Hargrave's work on flight) was first brought to the attention of the scientific world through the Journal and Proceedings of the Royal Society of New South Wales. In the last few decades specialist journals have become preferred for highly technical work but the Journal and Proceedings remains an important publication for multidisciplinary and transdisciplinary work.

The Journal and Proceedings are exchanged with hundreds of institutions worldwide. Issues are published June and December each year.

The Society welcomes scholarly work to be considered for publication in the Journal. Preference is given to work done in Australia which has relevance to New South Wales. Intending authors must read the style guide, available via the Society's web site (Journal), before submitting their manuscript for review.

Distinguished Fellows of the Society 
The Society recognises outstanding contributions to science, art, literature or philosophy with the position of Distinguished Fellow. Distinguished Fellows of the Society are entitled to use the postnominal Dist FRSN. There can be up to 25 Distinguished Fellows at any one time.

Current Distinguished Fellows of the Society

Past Distinguished Fellows of the Society

Notable members 
 Charles Anderson, mineralogist, paleontologist and president in 1924
 Louis Becke, writer
 John Blaxland, Army officer, historian and academic
 William Branwhite Clarke, geologist and long-time vice-president
 James Charles Cox, conchologist
 Lawrence Hargrave, a pioneer of manned flight and aeronautics
 William Stanley Jevons, one of the founders of microeconomics
 Philip Sydney Jones, surgeon, a member for 51 years
 Gerard Krefft, zoologist, palaeontologist, and Curator of the Australian Museum (1861-1874)
 Robert Hamilton Mathews, anthropologist and surveyor
 Eliezer Levi Montefiore (elected member 1875), first director of the Art Gallery of New South Wales
 William Scott, astronomer and clergyman
 Edward Wollstonecraft, a founding member of the original Philosophical Society of Australasia
 Horatio George Anthony Wright, microscopist and medical practitioner, honorary treasurer 1879–85 and 1893–1901, vice-president 1885–86 and 1891–92, chairman microscopy 1877–92

Awards
The society makes a number of awards for meritorious contributions in the field of science.

The Clarke Medal is awarded by the Society for distinguished work in the Natural sciences. It was named in honour of the Reverend William Branwhite Clarke, one of the founders of the Society. The medal was to be "awarded for meritorious contributions to Geology, Mineralogy and Natural History of Australasia, to be open to men of science, whether resident in Australasia or elsewhere". The Medal is now awarded annually for distinguished work in the natural sciences (geology, botany and zoology) done in the Australian Commonwealth and its territories. Each discipline is considered every three years. For a complete list of medalists see Clarke Medal.

The Edgeworth David Medal, established in 1942, is awarded for distinguished contributions by a young scientists under the age of thirty-five years for work done mainly in Australia or its territories or contributing to Australian science. It is named after the geologist, Sir Edgeworth David, FRS, who wrote the first comprehensive record of the geology of Australia.

The James Cook Medal, established in 1947, is awarded periodically for outstanding contributions to science and human welfare in and for the Southern Hemisphere.

Presidents
From 1850 to 1880, the President of the Society was the Governor of New South Wales.  In 1881, when the Society was incorporated by an Act of the New South Wales Parliament, the Act provided that Presidents of the Society be elected by the members.

References

 
Tyler, Peter (2010) Journal & Proceedings of the Royal Society of New South Wales, vol 143, nos 435–6, pp 29–43

External links 
Society web-site

Scientific organisations based in Australia
Society of New South Wales, Royal
Learned societies of Australia
1821 establishments in Australia
Clubs and societies in New South Wales
Organizations established in 1821
Philosophical societies in Australia